Hugh Reticker (1884–1969) was an American art director associated with the Hollywood studio Warner Brothers. He worked on more than seventy films during his career.

Selected filmography
 The Widow from Monte Carlo (1935)
 Murder by an Aristocrat (1936)
 She Loved a Fireman (1937)
 Sergeant Murphy (1938)
 You Can't Get Away with Murder (1939)
 Gambling on the High Seas (1940)
 The Great Mr. Nobody (1941)
 Across the Pacific (1942)

References

Bibliography
 Patrick J. McGrath. John Garfield: The Illustrated Career in Films and on Stage. McFarland, 1993.

External links

1884 births
1969 deaths
American art directors